David West Read is a Canadian television writer, playwright, and producer. He is best known for his work as a writer and producer for the television series Schitt's Creek, for which he won numerous Golden Globes and an Emmy. He also wrote the book for the award-winning stage musical & Juliet.

Early life and education 
Read was born in Scarborough, Toronto in 1983. He grew up in Markham and attended the University of Toronto as an undergraduate. He graduated from New York University's Tisch School of the Arts in 2010 with a Master's degree in dramatic writing.

Career 
In 2012, Read's second play The Performers opened on Broadway, marking it as the first time since 1984 that a Canadian playwright opened a show on Broadway that wasn't a musical.

Read wrote & Juliet, a stage musical with the premise that Juliet Capulet of Shakespeare's Romeo and Juliet survived the original play's tragic ending. The musical opened on West End in 2019 and in Toronto in 2022. It will open on Broadway in 2022 and in Melbourne in 2023.  

Read was as Executive Producer and writer on the Canadian sitcom Schitt's Creek. His work was acknowledged with an Emmy Award for Outstanding Comedy Series in 2020.

In 2021, Apple TV announced that David West Read would adapt The Big Door Prize, a novel by M.O. Walsh, into a series.

Works

Theatre 
 The Dream of the Burning Boy, 2011
 The Performers, 2012
 Afterlove, 2015
 & Juliet, 2019

TV 
 Schitt's Creek
 The Big Door Prize

Awards 
David West Read won an Emmy for Executive Director for Outstanding Comedy Series for his work on Schitt's Creek in 2020. He was a part of the show's writing and producing team who won a Golden Globe for Best Musical/Comedy Series in 2021.

References 

1983 births
Living people
21st-century Canadian dramatists and playwrights
21st-century Canadian screenwriters
21st-century Canadian male writers
Canadian male dramatists and playwrights
Canadian male screenwriters
Canadian television writers
Writers from Toronto
University of Toronto alumni
New York University alumni